The  is a pair of six-panel folding screens by the Japanese artist , founder of the Hasegawa school of Japanese art. The precise date for the screens is not known, but they were clearly made in the late 16th century, in the Momoyama period, around 1595. The screens are held by the Tokyo National Museum, and were designated as a National Treasure of Japan in 1952.

They are said to be the first paintings of their scale to depict only trees as subject matter, although a white shape to the upper right of the left panel might suggest a background mountain peak. Each screen measures .

Construction
The screens are made of a relatively rough silk or paper medium, and form twelve panels consisting of six joined pieces of paper. Tōhaku used a straw brush to achieve the scale required of the screens.

Some aspects of the screen's construction suggest that the piece may have been a preparatory work: the top and bottom pieces of joined paper on each screen are half the typical size used for screens; the sizes of paper used in each screen are slightly different, and the joins between the sheets are not completely regular. The seals for the artist's names, "Hasegawa" and "Tōhaku", do not use the usual forms. The trees on the far right of the right panel are cropped, suggesting that the order of the panels may have been altered or that some may have been replaced.

Style of painting
It combines naturalistic Chinese ideas of ink painting by Muqi Fachang with themes from the Japanese  landscape tradition, influenced by the  works of Sesshū Tōyō. The painting makes use of the intended foldings of the screen in use to create perspective, with branches directed towards or away from the viewer. Though the paintings are based in Chinese ideas of ink painting, monochrome ink-wash paintings on such a large scale was a Japanese innovation never seen in China; here Tōhaku used a straw brush on relatively coarse paper to achieve the right brush effects on a large scale.

See also
List of National Treasures of Japan (paintings)

References

Japanese paintings
16th-century paintings
National Treasures of Japan
1590s in Japan
Byōbu
Paintings in the collection of the Tokyo National Museum